In the 2001–02 season, the Tercera División – the fourth tier of the Spanish football league system – consisted of 17 groups each of 20 teams.

Classification

Group I

Group II

Group III

Group IV

Group V

Group VI

Group VII

Group VIII

Group IX

Group X

Group XI

Group XII

Group XIII

Group XIV

Group XV

Group XVI

Group XVII

References

External links
Futbolme.com

 
Tercera División seasons
4
Spain